Marwan Issa (born 1965 AKA Abu-Baraa) is the Palestinian leader of Hamas' military wing, the Izz ad-Din al-Qassam Brigades. In 2012, Issa replaced Ahmed Jabari as the group's military leader after Jabari was killed in a targeted Israeli air strike.

In 2007, Issa survived a targeted attack by Israeli forces.

References

Hamas military members
Hamas members
1965 births
Living people